The 2009 Southland Conference tournament was held at Cowgirl Diamond on the campus of McNeese State University in Lake Charles, Louisiana, from May 7 through May 9, 2009. The tournament winner, Texas State, earned the Southland Conference's automatic bid to the 2009 NCAA Division I softball tournament.

Format
The top 6 teams will qualify for the Southland softball tournament. The tournament used a true double-elimination format with a maximum of eleven games.

Tournament

All times listed are Central Daylight Time.

Awards and honors
Source:  

Tournament MVP: Chandler Hall - Texas State

All-Tournament Teams:

 Amber Anderson - UTSA
 Morgan Mikulin - Sam Houston State
 Hailey Wiginton - Sam Houston State
 Bethany Stefinsky - McNeese State
 Lindsey Langner - McNeese State
 Liz Morvant - McNeese State
 Leah Boatwright - Texas State
 Ryan Kos - Texas State
 Taylor Hall - Texas State
 Allyce Rother - Texas State
 Chandler Hall - Texas State (MVP)

See also
2009 Southland Conference baseball tournament

References

Southland Conference softball tournament
Tournament